Sudisman (1920 – October 1968) was a general secretary of the Communist Party of Indonesia (PKI) and the only PKI leader to be put on trial following the 30 September Movement in 1965. He was sentenced to death and executed.

He was the fourth highest-ranking member of the Communist Party of Indonesia's Politburo, and was the only one of the five senior leaders of PKI to be tried. All but one of the ten PKI politburo members were killed.

Sudisman tried to reorganize the PKI into an underground movement after other senior leaders were captured and summarily executed. He acted as the leader of the PKI for a short time before his arrest. He was finally arrested in December 1966.

Trial

Sudisman was the highest ranking PKI politburo member to appear before the Mahmillub (Mahkamah Militer Luar Biasa, the Extraordinary Military Tribunal), as the other members had been killed. Sudisman's trial was held in July 1967.

Testimonies of Sudisman and other PKI leaders greatly strengthened the case against them in the trial. They more or less admitted their own involvement in a coup attempt. However, they claimed that the 30 September Movement was justified as there had really been a so-called "Council of Generals" that had plotted against Sukarno to take power after his death, or to depose him. They denied accusations and interpretations that the PKI had been the sole organizer of the coup attempt. Army's and prosecution's version of the events are highly unlikely, and the first initiative for the coup attempt may have come from dissatisfied army officers, despite the PKI leadership's involvement.

Sudisman's testimonies gave a plausible explanation that PKI as an organization had not been involved with the coup attempt, and Dipa Nusantara Aidit had been the person who had acted on his own initiative and plotted with the officers. Suharto managed to use Aidit's actions as a justification for the Indonesian killings of 1965–66. The resulting elimination of the PKI from Indonesian politics achieved goals of right-wing officers and Muslim extremists who were backed by the United States.

Sudisman was executed in October 1968.

See also

Nasakom
Transition to the New Order

References

External links
Defence speech given by Sudisman on 21 July 1967 at the Marxists Internet Archive 
Speech given by Sudisman in September 1966 at the Marxists Internet Archive 

1920 births
1968 deaths
Indonesian communists
Communist Party of Indonesia politicians
20th-century executions by Indonesia
Executed communists